Aksel Kallas (16 June 1890 Rõuge, Kreis Werro – 3 April 1922 Berlin) was an Estonian clergyman and politician, son of Rudolf Kallas. He served as a pastor in Paistu, Jõhvi and Rõuge, and during the Estonian War of Independence as a military chaplain on the Narva front and in Võru. He was a member of the I Riigikogu, representing the Christian People's Party. After his death in 1922, he was replaced by Madis Rookman.

References

1890 births
1922 deaths
People from Rõuge Parish
People from Kreis Werro
Christian People's Party (Estonia) politicians
Members of the Riigikogu, 1920–1923